Lu Yi may refer to:

Lu Xun (Three Kingdoms) (183–245), original name Lu Yi, Eastern Wu general and chancellor of the Three Kingdoms period
Lü Yi (Eastern Wu) (died 238), Eastern Wu official of the Three Kingdoms period
Lü Yi (Shu Han) (died 251), Shu Han official of the Three Kingdoms period
Lu Yi (Tang dynasty) (847–905), Tang dynasty chancellor
Lü Yi (Ming dynasty) (died 1409), Ming dynasty general
Lu Yi (actor) (born 1976), Chinese actor

Sportspeople
Lü Yi (runner) (born 1974), female Chinese middle-distance runner
Lü Yi (Paralympic athlete) (born 1977), Chinese Paralympic athlete
Lü Yi (badminton) (born 1985), Chinese badminton player
Lu Yi (footballer) (born 1993), Chinese footballer

See also
Luyi (disambiguation)